Barrionuevo is a Spanish surname. Notable people with the surname include:

Carlos Barrionuevo (1977–2015), Argentine footballer
Claudia Barrionuevo (born 1991), Argentine model and beauty pageant winner
Ezequiel Barrionuevo (born 1986), Argentine footballer
Federico Barrionuevo (born 1981), Argentine footballer
Horacio Barrionuevo (born 1939), Argentine footballer
José Barrionuevo (born 1942), Spanish politician
Luis Barrionuevo (born 1949), Argentine high jumper
Noel Barrionuevo (born 1984), Argentine field hockey player
Raúl Armando Barrionuevo (1913–1996), Chilean farmer and politician
Walter Barrionuevo (born 1954), Argentine politician

Spanish-language surnames